The 2012 South Australian National Football League season was the 133rd season of the top-level Australian rules football competition in South Australia.
The season opened on Friday 23 March with a night match between Woodville-West Torrens and Port Adelaide, and concluded on Sunday 7 October with the Grand Final in which Norwood (minor premiers) won its 28th premiership by defeating West Adelaide (third at the end of the minor rounds).

Central District, North Adelaide and Woodville-West Torrens also made the top (final) five teams and participated in the finals matches, with Central District failing to make the Grand Final for the first time since 2000.  Glenelg, Port Adelaide, South Adelaide and Sturt all missed the top five, with the latter finishing last to win its 20th wooden spoon.

Premiership season

Round 1

Round 2

Round 3

Round 4

Round 5

Round 6

Round 7

Round 8

Round 9

Round 10

Round 11

Round 12

Round 13

Round 14 – Centacare Multicultural Round

Round 15

Round 16

Round 17

Round 18

Round 19

Round 20

Round 21

Round 22

Round 23

Round 24

Ladder

Finals series

Finals week 1 – Elimination & Qualifying Finals

Finals week 2 – 1st & 2nd Semi-finals

Finals week 3 – Preliminary final

Finals week 4 – Grand Final

Club performances

SANFL Win/Loss Table

Bold – Home game
X – Did Not Play
Opponent for round listed above margin
|}

Current clubs

References

External links
 SANFL
 Adelaide Advertiser's SANFL Page

South Australian National Football League seasons
SANFL